Mariusz Gogol (born 28 July 1991 in Białystok) is a Polish former professional footballer who played as a defender.

Career

Club
In February 2011, he was loaned to Ruch Wysokie Mazowieckie. In 2012, following his spell with Jagiellonia Białystok, Gogol signed for Olimpia Zambrów. In 2017, Gogol signed for German club SV 07 Eschwege. In January 2019, Gogol signed for PFC Victoria London, a club for the Polish diaspora in the United Kingdom.

International
He was a part of Poland national under-19 football team.

References

External links 
 

1991 births
Living people
Sportspeople from Białystok
Polish footballers
Poland youth international footballers
Association football defenders
Jagiellonia Białystok players
Ruch Wysokie Mazowieckie players
Chojniczanka Chojnice players
Olimpia Zambrów players
PFC Victoria London players
Ekstraklasa players
II liga players
III liga players
Polish expatriate footballers
Polish expatriate sportspeople in England
Polish expatriate sportspeople in Germany
Expatriate footballers in England
Expatriate footballers in Germany